Lt. Col. Elizaveta Ivanovna Mukasei (21 March 1912, Ufa – 19 September 2009, Moscow) was a Soviet spy codenamed Elza. Along with her husband Mikhail Mukasei (whose codename was Zephyr), she took part in a number of undercover operations in Western Europe and the United States from the 1940s through to the 1970s. She died on September 19, 2009, in Moscow at age 97. Her husband died on August 19, 2008, aged 101.

References

External links
Елизавета Ивановна Мукасей на сайте Службы внешней разведки России

1912 births
2009 deaths
Military personnel from Ufa
Soviet spies against Western Europe
Soviet spies against the United States
World War II spies for the Soviet Union
Russian memoirists
Recipients of the Order of Alexander Nevsky
Saint Petersburg State University alumni
20th-century memoirists